Hove railway station serves Hove in the county of East Sussex, England. The station and the majority of trains serving it are operated by Southern.

Gatwick Express trains stable at Hove from time to time.

It is the closest railway station to the County Cricket Ground, Hove where Sussex CCC play matches.

History 
The original Hove railway station, situated further to the east, opened on 11 May 1840 by the London & Brighton Railway, on its line from Brighton to Shoreham-by-Sea, designed by the architect David Mocatta. It closed on 1 March 1880, and the site became part of Holland Road Goods Depot. A wooden halt named Holland Road Halt was also opened a short distance to the west in 1905, served by local trains towards Worthing and on the branch line to Devil's Dyke. This closed in 1956, and no trace now remains of its platforms.

The present Hove station was opened on 1 October 1865. It was originally named Cliftonville, then West Brighton, before being renamed Hove and West Brighton in 1894 and finally Hove' in 1895.

Station architecture 
The original station building, dating from the station's opening in 1865, is on the south side of the line and to the east of the present ticket office and concourse, being separated from this by a long footbridge (a public right of way) linking the residential roads of Goldstone Villas and Hove Park Villas. The section of road on which the original building stands is called Station Approach. It is currently in commercial use.  The design is very similar to that of the buildings still in use at West Worthing, Shoreham-by-Sea, Portslade and London Road stations, and the former Kemp Town station in Brighton.

In 1893, coinciding with the first renaming, a new building was provided to the west. This contains the current ticket office and other station facilities. A large steel and glass porte-cochere stands outside at an angle, sheltering the taxi rank, forecourt and entrance area. This was moved from London Victoria following rebuilding works there which had rendered it redundant.

The island platform is reached by subway; access from the footbridge between the old and new buildings is no longer possible, as the stairs from it are locked out of use. This platform has a modest building incorporating a café, staff accommodation and waiting room, with a separate toilet block. A wide canopy runs for most of the length of the platform.

Future developments 
In 2007, a Department for Transport white paper on the Thameslink Programme contained proposals to extend the Thameslink network to various additional routes in southern England; one of these would have been the section of the West Coastway line between Hove and Littlehampton, with services running via the Cliftonville Curve from the Brighton Main Line. Two trains per peak hour have been extended from London Bridge to Bedford from 20 May 2018 and an extra service will join in December 2018.

Layout
There are three platforms – Platforms 1 and 2 can be (and are) used for any combination of arrival or departure. Platform 3 cannot be used for arrivals from the West Coastway or departures towards London in the up direction.

Services
Off-peak, all services at Hove are operated by Southern using  and  EMUs.

The typical off-peak service in trains per hour is:
 2 tph to  via 
 4 tph to 
 2 tph to 
 1 tph to 
 1 tph to 

During the peak hours, the station is served by a small number of direct trains between Brighton and Littlehampton.

Until May 2022, Great Western Railway operated limited services between Brighton, Portsmouth Harbour and Bristol Temple Meads that called at Hove.

See also
Grade II listed buildings in Brighton and Hove: E–H

References

External links
My Brighton and Hove - Holland Road Halt
My Brighton and Hove - the original Hove station and surroundings
Route description

David Mocatta railway stations
Former London, Brighton and South Coast Railway stations
Grade II listed buildings in Brighton and Hove
Grade II listed railway stations
Hove
Railway stations in Brighton and Hove
DfT Category C2 stations
Railway stations in Great Britain opened in 1865
Railway stations served by Govia Thameslink Railway